Yuri Dmitrievich Petukhov (May 17, 1951 – February 1, 2009) Russian sci-fi writer, philosopher, publisher, non-academic explorer in world history and philology.

Biography 

Petukhov was born in Moscow. From 1969 to 1971, he served in the Soviet army in Hungary. From 1972 to 1985, he worked in a military-related scientific institute. In 1983 he published his first book (in the realistic genre, about life of motor-rifle troops) Two Springs from Now.

In 1990 and 1991, he published the novels Massacre and Satanic Potion, which by his own words opened a "new genre" of Russian literature—"super-new black wave" or "literature of sverkhrealism". In August 1991, he stated that World War III has happened and new world partition is going on.

In his autobiographical essay "Black House" (1994) he gives his evidence of the events of the autumn of 1993 in Moscow, how he was marching through Krymsky Bridge to Moscow City Hall, moved to Ostankino TV center and got there under severe shooting, and saw crowds admiring the White House shelling which was shocking for him. In his opinion, march of October 3[ru]  was Russian people's uprising against Anglo-American colonial regime, but the victory was lost due to indecision of White House defenders' leaders.

Petukhov died in February 2009 when visiting his parents' graves.

Publishing activity 

Most of well-known Petukhov's editions of the 1990s were published in his own publishing house "Metagalaktika". Bondarenko remembers that all his author's fee and publisher's profit he spent on publishing newspapers and magazines. Petukhov published:
 Newspaper "Voice of the Universe", subtitled as "Information-publicistic and literary independent newspaper: press organ of non-governmental transcendental spheres". Most materials in the newspaper were thus not subscribed. "Voice of the Universe" is ironically mentioned in humorous book "Остров Русь 2, или Принцесса Леокады" (2009) by Stanislav and Yuliy Burkin as reading of father of main characters, who was turned on everything anomal.

 Magazine "Adventures, fantastics", many separate books (all this mostly written by himself). Logo of this magazine could be seen on most editions of Petukhov (pictured).

In 1990s Petukhov's editions were rather widespread and well-sold.

Reception 
In 1991, critic Vladimir Gopman in his article Cat at TV-set, or "Poor Men's" Fantastics compared reader of Petukhov and some other writers who appeared in Soviet Union at this time with the eponymous Cat which is not very selective in art. He attested Petukhov as able promoter but bad writer, and his publicistics he connected with chauvinistic Soviet groups.

Vl. Gakov's "Encyclopedia of Fantastics" says: "Petukhov has become known mainly not for his multiple novels and stories, which have no special literature merits, but for Petukhov's pathological desire to make espatage on public with obtrusive propaganda of own 'geniality': multiple interviews with himself, advertising posters and pamphlets, declarations in press."
Writers V. Bondarenkoru and V. Lichutin, on other side, estimate Petukhov highly.

Historical, political and philological views 
Petukhov developed a theory of pseudohistory and pseudophilology, which stated that all real people are come from Ruses and all languages are developed from Russian. His best known work on this topic is 3-volumed History of Ruses. The whole series of books about what he called "true history" was published by his own publishing house Metagalaktika. Petukhov stated that all best-known historical science is nothing but result of geopolitical ambitions and "town fantasies" of Romano-German historists.

As an example of his views, he said that the Mongol conquest was nothing but a great myth created by Catholic priests; Mongolian Horde were just kind of Cossacks returning from East, and Batu Khan was Alexandr Nevsky. Petukhov stated that Europe and America were created by Russians and should be repossessed. All Soviet and Russian leaders, except Stalin, were according to him traitors and degenerates; in a last work of him New World Order he accused America of starting World War III by exploding Chernobyl and forecasted to Russia a victory in the final battle.

Petukhov turned to the etymology proposed by Max Müller, who derived the term "Aryans" from the Slavic "orati", meaning "to plow". Petukhov ignored later evidence of the fallacy of this etymology. At the same time, under the influence of the ideas of one of the founders of Russian neo-paganism, Alexey Dobrovolsky (Dobroslav), who did not have a higher education, Petukhov derived the root "ar" from "yar", "yary".

Petukhov and religion 
Yuri Petukhov declared himself to be Orthodoxal Christian, but in his books there are many neo-pagan and ufological motives. For example, he said that Jesus Christ was born in family of Ruses to whom Jerusalem used to belong. Brochure "Devil and his present lying miracles and lying prophets" (ca. 1993), published by Danilov monastery under blessing of Alexy II, editions of Petukhov (newspaper Voice of the Universe, libraries of Galaktika and Metagalaktika, book Prediction etc.) are described as containing blasphemy and falsifications, inacceptable and leading believers who will read them into hell.

Encyclopedia of Beings from Space 
The Encyclopedia of Beings from Space included dozens of pictures of different monsters, which appeared in newspaper Voice of the Universe in 1991; each picture was accompanied by text displaying characteristics of the monster.

Star Revenge 
The pentalogy Star Revenge (1990–1995) is the best known of Petukhov's works. It is set primarily in the 25th to 33rd centuries. This book, as example of "patriotic" fiction, contains much of politic suggestions.

Plot 
 Angel of Revenge («Ангел Возмездия», «Система», 1990)
Main character, space desanter Ivan, suddenly remembers how his parents were killed by non-humanoids, and he as baby was left in rescue boat into open space. Ivan wants revenge and finds way to that place, but can do nothing to superpowered aliens; escaping in last moment, he knows that invasion on the Earth is prepared.
 Rebel of Ghouls («Бунт вурдалаков», «Пристанище», 1993)
 Being back, Ivan tries to warn government, but he is not listened at. Some time after he is sent to some planet to rescue earthlings-hostages. It appeared that people of the 33rd century made there a polygon beyond time and space; they created monsters—leshys, undeads etc. They didn't know that there were really such beings. Monsters from hell got to the polygon, killed half of people and turned others into living source of biomass. The polygon was closed, turned into Refuge and sent into past—to 25th century. Monsters wanted to get to the Earth, where they already have supporters – as members of government, who have sent Ivan to death. Ivan succeeded to get out from Refuge; now he knew that the invasion can happen any moment from two directions – from System or from Refuge.
 Immersion into Darkness («Погружение во мрак», «Каторга», 1994)
 Ivan decided to fight on his own and gathers a crew. Ivan goes to underwater servitude on planet Girgea to rescue his friend—former space desanter and chief of a band Goog Hlodrick the Wild. He and his friends meet different strange races–"before-exploders" (bodyless supercivilizations of universe which was before Big Bang), troggs etc. It appears that Earth is already governed by banditic syndicates and satanic sects, some of which has relations to invaders.
 Invasion from Hell («Вторжение из ада», «Вторжение», 1995)
Ivan and his friends are up to overthrow malicious government of Earth. Alpha-corpus of space desant takes their side, great war shocks all the world, Antarctic continent is beaten through to destroy shelter of rich rascals. They take power over Great Russia and whole world, but too late—traitors have called back all the outer armed forces for renovation to open road for invaders. But main struck is from underearth—hordes of satanoids and diabloids (mutated members of satanic sects controlled by aliens) creep out, destroy everything and kill everybody. Ivan accuses himself that humanity is destroyed from his wrongs, and in Khram in Moscow (associated with Cathedral of Christ the Saviour, it's the only place which is protected from invaders by supernatural force) he commits suicide.
Sword of Pantocrator («Меч Вседержителя», «Армагеддон», 1995)
All people of Earth are arisen from death by "infernofields" for endless torture and serving as blood and flesh fabrics for monsters. Last centers of resistance in space can do nothing but continue their hopeless struggle. Ivan goes to hell but is taken from there by a light ray. He sees Archangel Michael and then God (in image of grey-eyed fair-haired men, which is prototypic appearance of Petukhov's Ruses). God tells him that a "chain of worlds" has been before – each world was created good with some beings having soul (in Ivan's world, they were Ruses) and some not, but afterwards by freedom of will evil appeared and by cunning way took the upper hand so that the world turned into hell-like place; after that world was destroyed by "Big Bang", but some evil forces can stay alive and get into future and another worlds. He says that Ivan has no guilt except suicide, and as the last Rus Ivan is sent to be "Pantocrator's sword". Ivan is arisen from death in Khram and joins to his friends for a while. Then he goes into Axial dimension (a road connecting worlds and places where one must struggle with phantoms of his memory) and finds road into Old World – place out of time which bourned everything else, "New worlds". Mag lived 3000 years before tells him (Petukhov's version of) world history: how Proto-Ruses came from Hyperborea and learned soulless protanthrops to be humans, and how then among them God's space rays introduced to be born Ruses – people who created all the civilization but by traitors and false historians came into forgottenness and decay. Ivan gets power of all Ruses ever lived. Additionally, mag learns him how to travel by time. The learning in Old World happens beyond time but Ivan must see all his friends dying. Afterwards, he comes out, and with his power destroys parasites from all Earth's history, so that the invasion have never happened.

Influence 
The author's Encyclopedia of Star Revenge wasn't finished or published. The 1993 song Звёздная месть by group Железный поток was loosely based on themes from the novel. The 2010 amateur film "Зоряна помста" (Ukrainian for "Star Revenge") by study "УПВ Арт Груп" (Kyiv) has minor connections with Petukhov's plot, it mostly parodies Western sci-fi action films (including Star Wars, Dune and Tremors).

Judicial prohibitions of Petukhov's works 

On July 20, 2006, a procurature of Central district of Volgograd initiated complex examination of Petukhov's works by group of psychologists, politologists and linguists. They concluded that the texts propagand ideas of burning racial, national and religious dissention, cult of force and violence, xenophobia. В прокуратуру Москвы были направлены материалы на предмет наличия состава преступления.

February 5, 2007 Perovsky court of Moscow made a precedent of prohibition of artistic books. Law "About defence to extremistic activity" was applied to Petukhov's books. Books "World War IV" («Четвертая Мировая») and "Genocide" («Геноцид») confirmed to be extremistic,prohibited and due to be taken out and be destroyed.

Petukhov claimed a cassation in higher instance.

References

External links 

20th-century Russian writers
Russian science fiction writers
Pseudohistorians

Writers from Moscow
Burials at Vagankovo Cemetery
Russian nationalists
1951 births
2009 deaths